The 2022 Bidhannagar Municipal Corporation election will be held on 12 February 2022 to elect 41 members of the Bidhannagar Municipal Corporation (BMC) which governs Bidhannagar, the Satellite city of the capital city of Indian state of West Bengal, Kolkata in the district of North 24 Parganas.

Schedule

Voter Statistics

Parties and alliances
Following is a list of political parties and alliances which contested in this election:

Candidates

Result

Party-wise Result

References

The West Bengal State Election Commission (WBSEC) on Thursday issued a notification to announce that elections to 108 municipalities in the state will be held on February 27. The notification, however, did not mention the date of vote counting, which, the officials said, will be declared later.

Elections to 108 municipalities will be held on February 27. The date of counting will be announced later. The entire election process will be completed by March 8,” an SEC official said. In 20 districts — Darjeeling, Cooch Behar, Alipurduar, Jalpaiguri, Uttar Dinajpur, Dakshin Dinajpur, Malda, Murshidabad, Nadia, North 24-Parganas, South 24-Parganas, Howrah, Hooghly, Purba Medinipur, Paschim Medinipur, Jhargram, Purulia, Bankura, Purba Bardhaman, Birbhum — 108 municipal bodies will go to polls. 
The list of candidates for elections to 107 municipalities, scheduled on February 27, has led to a major tussle in the Trinamool Congress (TMC).It all started with Kalyan Banerjee, senior leader and MP of TMC, openly criticising national general secretary Abhishek Banerjee. Young leaders of the party then started a campaign against Kalyan Banerjee. Although the party disciplinary committee has warned both the sections, the conflict doesn't seem to be ending.

2022 elections in India
Municipal corporation elections in India
Local elections in West Bengal